Roëzé-sur-Sarthe (before 2022: Roézé-sur-Sarthe) is a commune in the Sarthe department in the region of Pays de la Loire in north-western France. Roëzé-sur-Sarthe had a population of 2,620 in 2018.

See also
Communes of the Sarthe department

References

Communes of Sarthe